The 1958 College Football All-America team is composed of college football players who were selected as All-Americans by various organizations and writers that chose College Football All-America Teams in 1958. The six selectors recognized by the NCAA as "official" for the 1958 season are (1) the American Football Coaches Association (AFCA), (2) the Associated Press (AP), (3) the Football Writers Association of America (FWAA), (4) the Newspaper Enterprise Association (NEA), (5) the Sporting News, and (6) the United Press International (UPI).  

Three players were unanimously chosen as first-team All-Americans by all six official selectors.  They were: (1) quarterback Randy Duncan who won the 1958 Walter Camp Player of the Year Award and led the 1958 Iowa Hawkeyes to the 1958 FWAA national championship; (2) halfback Billy Cannon who led the 1958 LSU Tigers to the 1958 AP national championship and won the Heisman Trophy in 1959; and (3) Army halfback Pete Dawkins who won the 1958 Heisman Trophy and later became a Rhodes scholar, a brigadier general, co-chairman of Bain & Company, and CEO of Primerica.  All three have been inducted into the College Football Hall of Fame.

Consensus All-Americans
For the year 1958, the NCAA recognizes six published All-American teams as "official" designations for purposes of its consensus determinations. The following chart identifies the NCAA-recognized consensus All-Americans and displays which first-team designations they received.

All-American selections for 1958

Ends
Buddy Dial, Rice (AP-1, FWAA, NEA-1, SN, UPI-1, Time, WC)
Sam Williams, Michigan State (AFCA, UPI-1, Time, WC)
Jim Houston, Ohio State (AP-1, FWAA, NEA-2, UPI-3, CP)
Al Goldstein, North Carolina (FWAA, NEA-1)
Jim Wood, Oklahoma State (AFCA, AP-3)
Curt Merz, Iowa (FWAA, NEA-2)
Tom Franckhauser, Purdue (CP)
Monty Stickles, Notre Dame (AP-2, SN, NEA-3, UPI-2)
Carroll Dale, Virginia Tech (AP-2)
Rich Kreitling, Illinois (AP-3, UPI-2)
Jerry Wilson, Auburn (UPI-3)
Chris Burford, Stanford (NEA-3)

Tackles
 Ted Bates, Oregon State (AFCA, AP-1, NEA-1, SN, UPI-1, CP, WC)
 Brock Strom, Air Force (AP-1, NEA-3, UPI-1, WC)
 Jim Marshall, Ohio State (SN, UPI-3, Time)
 Ron Luciano, Syracuse (AP-2, NEA-1, UPI-2, CP)
 Bill Leeka,  UCLA  (Time)
 Andy Cvercko, Northwestern (FWAA)
 Don Floyd, TCU (AP-2, FWAA, NEA-2, UPI-3)
 Vel Heckman, Florida (AP-3, FWAA, NEA-3, UPI-2)
 Gene Selawski, Purdue (AP-3, FWAA, NEA-2)
 Hogan Wharton, Houston (AFCA)

Guards
John Guzik, Pittsburgh (AP-2, FWAA, NEA-1, SN, UPI-1, Time, WC)
Zeke Smith, Auburn (AP-1, FWAA, NEA-1, UPI-2, CP, Time, WC)
George Deiderich, Vanderbilt (AP-1, AFCA, FWAA, NEA-2, UPI-2)
Al Ecuyer, Notre Dame (UPI-1, CP, SN)
Bob Novogratz, Army (AP-3, FWAA, NEA-2, UPI-3)
John Wooten, Colorado (AFCA)
Jerry Stalcup, Wisconsin (AP-2, NEA-3)
Stan Renning, Montana (AP-3)
Tom Koenig, SMU (UPI-3)
George Fritzinger, Navy (NEA-3)

Centers
Bob Harrison, Oklahoma (AP-1, FWAA, NEA-1, SN, UPI-1, CP, WC)
Jackie Burkett, Auburn (AFCA, AP-2, NEA-2, UPI-3, Time)
Max Fugler, LSU (AP-3, FWAA, NEA-3, UPI-2)

Quarterbacks
Randy Duncan, Iowa  (AFCA, AP-1, FWAA, NEA-1, SN, UPI-1, CP, WC)
Joe Kapp,  California (AP-3, FWAA, NEA-2, UPI-2, Time)
Don Meredith, SMU   (AP-2, FWAA, UPI-2)
Tom Greene, Holy Cross (UPI-3)

Halfbacks
Billy Cannon, LSU  (AFCA, AP-1, FWAA, NEA-1, SN, UPI-1, CP, Time, WC)
Pete Dawkins, Army (AFCA, AP-1, FWAA, NEA-1, SN, UPI-1, CP, WC)
Bob Anderson, Army (AP-2, FWAA, NEA-2, UPI-2)
Dick Bass, Pacific (AP-2, NEA-2, UPI-2, Time)
Ron Burton, Northwestern (AP-3)
Alex Hawkins, South Carolina (AP-3)
Dick Thornton, Northwestern (UPI-3)
Jake Crouthamel, Dartmouth (NEA-3)
Don Perkins, New Mexico (NEA-3)

Fullbacks
Bob White, Ohio State (AP-2, FWAA, NEA-1, SN, UPI-1, CP, Time, WC)
Nick Pietrosante, Notre Dame (AFCA, AP-3, FWAA, NEA-2, UPI-3)
Bill Austin, Rutgers (AP-1, UPI-3)
Bob Jarus, Purdue (UPI-3)
Fred Pickard, Florida State (NEA-3)

Key

 Bold – Consensus All-American
 -1 – First-team selection
 -2 – Second-team selection
 -3 – Third-team selection

Official selectors
AFCA = American Football Coaches Association
AP = Associated Press
FWAA = Football Writers Association of America
NEA = Newspaper Enterprise Association
SN = Sporting News
UPI = United Press International

Other selectors
CP = Central Press Association
Time = Time magazine
WC = Walter Camp Football Foundation

See also
 1958 All-Atlantic Coast Conference football team
 1958 All-Big Eight Conference football team
 1958 All-Big Ten Conference football team
 1958 All-Pacific Coast Conference football team
 1958 All-SEC football team
 1958 All-Southwest Conference football team

References

All-America Team
College Football All-America Teams